Chionochloa rigida, known commonly as narrow-leaved snow tussock and by its Māori name wī kura, is a species of tussock grass endemic to New Zealand. Two subspecies are recognised, including Chionochloa rigida rigida and Chionochloa rigida amara.

Distribution 
Found throughout the lower half of the South Island, from Banks Peninsula and east of the Southern Alps through to Southland.

The subspecies C. rigida amara has a more western distribution and is found south of around 43°S in the Southern Alps.

Habitat 
Prefers montane to low alpine zones, but is known to descend to sea level in Otago. Prefers drier soils.

Conservation 
The narrow-leaved snow tussock is classified as Least Concern by the IUCN and Not Threatened by the Department of Conservation.

References 

rigida